Lawrence Harold Welsh (February 1, 1935 – January  13, 1999) was an American prelate of the Roman Catholic Church.  He served as an auxiliary bishop of the Archdiocese of Saint Paul and Minneapolis in Minnesota from 1991 to 1999.  He previously served as bishop of the Diocese of Spokane in Washington State from 1978 to 1989.

Biography

Early life 
Lawrence Welsh was born on February 1, 1935, in Winton, Wyoming.  He was ordained a priest for the Diocese of Helena by Bishop Joseph Michael Gilmore on March 26, 1962.

Bishop of Spokane 
On November 6, 1978, Pope John Paul II appointed Welsh as bishop of the Diocese of Spokane.  He was consecrated by Archbishop Raymond Gerhardt Hunthausen on December 14, 1978.  

Welsh was accused of reassigning the priest Patrick O'Donnell to another parish after three families brought allegations of sexual abuse of children by O'Donnell to the knowledge of Bishop Welsh.

On August 21, 1991, John Paul II accepted Welsh's resignation as bishop of the Diocese of Spokane.  His resignation came after a recent arrest in Spokane for driving under the influence of alcohol.

Auxiliary bishop of Saint Paul and Minneapolis 
On November 5, 1991, John Paul II appointed Welsh  an auxiliary bishop of the Archdiocese of Saint Paul and Minneapolis and Titular Bishop of Aulon Lawrence Welsh died on January 13, 1999, at age 63 in Helena, Montana.

In October 2002, it was revealed that Welsh was investigated by the Spokane Police Department in 1986 on an assault allegation from Chicago.  On September 9, 1986, a male sex worker claimed that Welsh, in Chicago for a Knights of Columbus convention, had taken him to a motel.  While the man was performing oral sex, he said that Welsh "began to strangle him."  During his police interview, Welsh admitted to picking up a so-called drug addict and taking him to his hotel room for counseling. On further questioning, Welsh admitted to putting his hands all over the accuser's body. 

On September 29, 1986, the Spokane police met with Welsh and Seattle Archbishop Raymond Hunthausen.  At this meeting, Welsh stated that "he did not feel he did anything violent in the course of the sex act and that if he had it would have been as an outlet for frustrations that had built up within him."  Welsh, Hunthausen, and the police detectives agreed that Welsh should be examined by a psychiatrist.Welsh was never charged in the incident; one former Spokane detective claimed that the story had been "handled in a hush-hush manner".  This incident did not become public until October 2002,  when the Spokane Spokesman-Review published the story.

Sources

Roman Catholic bishops of Spokane
20th-century Roman Catholic bishops in the United States
People from Sweetwater County, Wyoming
1935 births
1999 deaths
Roman Catholic Archdiocese of Saint Paul and Minneapolis
Roman Catholic Diocese of Rapid City
Catholics from Wyoming